Mansell Gamage is a village in Herefordshire, England. It is on the B4230 road and is near the A438 road.

References

Civil parishes in Herefordshire
Villages in Herefordshire